The 2002 Pennsylvania gubernatorial election was held on November 5, 2002, to elect the Governor and Lieutenant Governor of Pennsylvania. Incumbent Republican governor Mark Schweiker, who took office in 2001 when Tom Ridge resigned to become Homeland Security Advisor, was eligible to run for a full term, but did not do so. Democrat Ed Rendell, the former mayor of Philadelphia and Chairman of the Democratic National Committee, emerged from a competitive primary to win the general election against Republican Pennsylvania Attorney General Mike Fisher. This was the first time that a Democrat won all four of Philadelphia's suburban counties.

Republican primary 
Attorney General Mike Fisher ran unopposed for the Republican nomination. Although incumbent Governor Mark Schweiker was eligible to run for reelection (he had served only a partial term after Tom Ridge resigned to become Homeland Security Advisor), he chose not to seek his party's nomination. Despite polls showing that Schweiker polled well among the same groups that backed Ridge, the Republican establishment considered Schweiker to be a weak candidate and stood steadfast behind Fisher.

Democratic primary

Candidates
 Ed Rendell, former Mayor of Philadelphia and candidate in 1986
 Bob Casey Jr., incumbent Auditor General and son of former Governor Bob Casey Sr.

Campaign
In the Democratic primary, former mayor of Philadelphia Ed Rendell defeated Pennsylvania Auditor General Bob Casey Jr., bucking the "myth that a Philadelphian could never win" a statewide election. Despite strong support from organized labor for Casey, lackluster campaigning combined with Rendell's ability to cast himself as a strong executive allowed him to pull out a primary win.

Results

General election

Campaign
Fisher emphasized Rendell's Philadelphia roots continuously during his campaign and described the mayor as an urban liberal whose programs would require huge tax increases.

Polling

Predictions

Results

Rendell won the election, with commentators attributing his victory to "endless retail politicking" and a hard-working campaign. The political website PoliticsPA praised Rendell's campaign team of David L. Cohen, David W. Sweet, and Sandi Vito. Fisher's strategy backfired; Rendell performed well in much of Eastern Pennsylvania and he was able to win by huge margins in even many traditionally Republican suburbs.

Rendell was the first official from Philadelphia to win a spot in the governor's mansion since 1914.

Notes

References

See also

2002
2002
2002 United States gubernatorial elections